Vice Admiral Rodrigo Álvarez Aguirre is a Chilean admiral who serves as the incumbent Chief of the Joint Chiefs of Defence of the Chilean Armed Forces.

Background
He was born in Viña del Mar on January 26, 1961, and finished his studies at the Colegio Calasanz in Santiago. He entered the Naval Academy and graduated as a midshipman on January 1, 1981.

He has a Bachelor in Science of Engineering degree with a major in Electronics, and a Master of Science in Maritime Affairs from the Chilean Naval War College, before becoming a professor in Naval Operations in 1997. He served aboard the Chilean County-class destroyers Capitán Prat (D11), and Blanco Encalada (D-15). He also served in the Fleet Training Command, and in the Staff of the Fleet as an advisor and department head. He is also a General Staff Officer of the Air War Academy and the Naval War Academy; an Execution Engineer in Aeronautical Systems from the Air War Academy; and earned a Diploma in Peace Operations of the Naval War Academy.

His main destinations include his command as Commander of Aviation Group No. 4 of the MINUSTAH Helicopter Group in Haiti; became deputy director of the School of Aviation; became Director of Operations and Commander in Chief of the 1st Air Brigade and also served as Defense and Air Attaché of Chile in Israel.

A known Specialist in Electronic Naval Engineering and General Staff Management, he served as the commanding officer of the Uribe (LM-39), and the Almirante Latorre (FFG-14) in 1992, becoming her first commanding officer. He was also assigned at the Directorate of Programming, Investigation and Development at the Fourth Naval Region Staff.

He also toured overseas, including the Chilean Naval Mission in the United States, the Chilean embassy in Israel, and the Chilean Technical Inspectorate Office in the Netherlands during the purchase and transfer of the Karel Doorman-class frigates and Jacob van Heemskerck-class frigates. He became the Commander of the Fifth Naval Zone on November 22, 2010, and was promoted as Commodore.

He was promoted to the rank of Rear Admiral in 2012, and was named the Deputy Chief of the General Staff of the Navy in November 2012. He was named the Commander in Chief of the Fleet on December 5, 2014. He was named the Vice Chairman, Joint Chiefs of Staff in January 2016, and was promoted to the rank of Vice Admiral, before becoming the Chief of the Joint Chiefs of Defence on November 6, 2018.

References

1961 births
Chilean admirals
20th-century Chilean Navy personnel
21st-century Chilean Navy personnel
Living people